Londonderry is an unincorporated community located in Colchester County, Nova Scotia, Canada, formerly called Acadia Mines. A bustling iron ore mining and steel making town of some 5,000 in the late 19th century, the population today stands at around 200.

History
Londonderry saw the pouring of some of the first steel made in Canada, and the first Canadian installation of the Bessemer process for making steel. Mining began in 1849 and eventually three mines - East Mines, Old Mountain Mine, and West Mines - were operated. Over 2 million tons of ore were produced.

The iron ore seams that encouraged development, originally thought to be enormous, proved to be small, shallow, and very expensive to mine. That, coupled with poor management decisions and failed experiments with rotary type ovens as well as low world steel prices, spelled the demise of the iron and steel industry in Londonderry. The fatal blow to the community came with a destructive fire in 1920 which destroyed a large portion of the town. The mine operations were foreclosed in 1924 and the town never recovered thereafter. The once vast ruins of the former steel mill were torn down and sold as scrap during the scrap metal drives of World War II.

General information
The CN main line runs through Londonderry Station, about two kilometers east of the village of Londonderry.

Lakeshores at Sutherland's Lake and Folly Lake, only a 10 to 15 minute drive away, are sought-after cottage destinations for residents of nearby Truro, Amherst, Moncton, and Halifax.

Many residents of Londonderry are employed in the nearby Debert Industrial Park and at the Ski Wentworth ski resort, nestled in the Cobequid Mountains, about 20 minutes north of Londonderry along Trunk 4. Londonderry currently has two churches: the Londonderry Station Community Church (also known as the Thirsty Church Project), and St. Ambrose Catholic Church.  The Acadia Mines United Church was closed in 2010.

Settlement
The Township of Londonderry, including the Port of Londonderry (now Great Village), was first settled by two groups of Scots Irish emigrants.  The first group came from the town of Londonderry, New Hampshire in 1761 whilst a larger contingent who had arrived in Halifax in October 1761 on the ship Hopewell out of Londonderry in Ireland, settled a few years later once land grants were secured.  Both arrangements made by former British army Captain Alexander McNutt, who was formerly stationed at nearby Fort Cumberland and was originally from Ireland.

Early settlers
Those who settled Londonderry Township included the following individuals:
 Barnhill, John; of Lake, Donegal; resident of Londonderry/Onslow
 Clark, John; of Tamlaught Finleggan, Derry
 Cochran, Daniel; of Derrykeychen, Antrim
 Crawford, Joseph; of Rathmelton, Donegal
 Henderson, William; of Rathmullan, Donegal
 Mahon, John; of Rosses, Donegal; resident of Londonderry
 McClean, Anthony; of near Letterkenny, Donegal; resident of Londonderry
 McNutt, Benjamin Bar; of Killmacrene, Mauagh, Donegal
 McNutt, John; of Tullyachnish, Derry
 McNutt, William; of Mavagh, Donegal; resident of Onslow
 Moore, William; of Fahan, Donegal
 Morrison, John;of Ry Tollaghebegly Donegal; resident of Londonderry
 Patton, Mark; of Fosghan Vael, Derry; resident of Cumberland
 Ross, Andrew; of Belreshain, Antrim
 Smith, Robert; of Cahery, Drummacose, Derry
 Spencer, Robert; of Clanda Horky, Donegal; resident of Londonderry

Notable residents
 Laurie Davidson Cox (1883–1968), leading American landscape architect.
 Frank Parker Day, writer, taught school there
 Robert McElhinney (ca 1747–1831), Irish-born political figure who represented Londonderry Township in the Nova Scotia House of Assembly
 Archibald McLelan (1824–1890), Lieutenant Governor of Nova Scotia
 James Meissner (1896–1936), World War I flying, recipient of two Distinguished Service Crosses.
 Thomas Fletcher Morrison (1808–1886), sailor, farmer and political figure in Nova Scotia
 Doris Petrie (1918–2000), Canadian film and television actress

Parks
Londonderry Play Place
Londonderry Provincial Park
Wentworth Provincial Park

See also
 Charles Dickson Archibald

References

External links
 Destination: Nova Scotia with a road map of the Londonderry area
 mindat.org

Communities in Colchester County
Mining communities in Nova Scotia